The Hundred of Wonoka is a cadastral unit of hundred in the County of Blachford, South Australia.

Local government
The hundred was first locally governed by the District Council of Hawker, with Wonoka ward electing one dedicated councillor. In 1997 the hundred become a part of the Flinders Ranges Council with the amalgamation of Hawker and Kanyaka councils.

See also 
 Lands administrative divisions of South Australia

References 

Wonoka